Shahrestan Adab (established 2010) is an Iranian publishing house which mainly focuses on publishing collections of poems, novels and books of literary criticism.

Awards
In 2014, Shahrestan Adab has been awarded Iran's Publisher of the Year by President Hassan Rouhani.

Notes

External links
 Website in Persian 

Book publishing companies of Iran
Publishing companies established in 2010
2010 establishments in Iran